Alejandro Sebastián Zúñiga Villarreal (born 12 May 1988, in Santiago) is a Chilean judoka. At the 2012 Summer Olympics he competed in the Men's 66 kg, but was defeated in the second round by the eventual gold medallist, Lasha Shavdatuashvili from Georgia. His parents are also judokas.

References

1988 births
Living people
Chilean male judoka
Olympic judoka of Chile
Judoka at the 2012 Summer Olympics
20th-century Chilean people
21st-century Chilean people